Drumsite is a settlement on Christmas Island, Australia. Is located on the northeast coast, near the capital, Flying Fish Cove. The ethnic composition of the population is Chinese and European. In the area there are migration routes of red crabs that are protected.

The Drumsite Village project, a new housing development, was approved by the Gillard administration amid concerns about the growing number of asylum seekers on the island, and is administered by a Queensland company.

Two historic sites within the settlement, Bungalow 702 and the Drumsite Industrial Area, are listed on the Australian Commonwealth Heritage List.

References

Populated places in Christmas Island